Linn Township is a township in Linn County, Iowa.

History
Linn Township was organized in 1843.

References

Townships in Linn County, Iowa
Townships in Iowa
1843 establishments in Iowa Territory